The XV 2009 Pan Am Badminton Championships were held in Guadalajara, Mexico, between October 20 and October 25, 2009.

This event was part of the 2009 BWF Grand Prix Gold and Grand Prix series of the Badminton World Federation.

Venue
Coliseo Olímpico de la Universidad de Guadalajara

Medalists

References

External links
Official website
TournamentSoftware.com: Individual Results
TournamentSoftware.com: Team Results

Pan Am Badminton Championships
Pan Am Badminton Championships
Pan Am Badminton Championships
Badminton tournaments in Mexico
Sport in Guadalajara, Jalisco
Bad
21st century in Guadalajara, Jalisco